Laumatiamanu Ringo Purcell (born ~1968) is a Samoan politician and Member of the Legislative Assembly of Samoa. He is a member of the FAST Party.

Laumatiamanu was educated at Saint Joseph’s College and is a former police officer. He later worked for the Samoa Shipping Corporation. He first ran for election at the 2016 Samoan general election as a candidate for the Human Rights Protection Party. He switched allegiance to the FAST Party to contest the 2021 election, but lost to Nonu Lose Niumata. He subsequently lodged an election petition, resulting in Nonu resigning in a settlement. Both candidates contested the resulting by-election, with Laumatiamanu winning by over 100 votes.

References

Living people
1968 births
Members of the Legislative Assembly of Samoa
Faʻatuatua i le Atua Samoa ua Tasi politicians
Samoan police officers